Alexis Rose Alford (born April 10, 1998), also known as Lexie Limitless, is an American adventure traveller who is notable for traveling to 196 countries before reaching the age of twenty-one. Alford was awarded two Guinness World Records; being the "Youngest person to travel to all sovereign countries" and being the "Youngest female to travel to all sovereign countries" at the age of 21 years, 177 days.

Early life 
Alford was born and raised in Nevada City, California to a middle-class family. She decided by the age of twelve that she wanted to explore the world. Her parents were travel agents from whom she learned the skills of booking reservations and planning an itinerary. At age 18, she graduated with an associate degree at a community college.

Career 
After earning her degree, Alford had saved up funds by working during her teenage years to self-fund her travels. In addition, she supplements her income by blogging, doing freelance photography, and selling prints; according to Alford, she spends an "ungodly amount of time researching the best deals and thoroughly learning how to travel to exotic places on a budget". While traveling, she describes herself as a minimalist, carrying only the supplies that she needs in a backpack along with her videography equipment.

YouTube 
She launched her YouTube channel a few months after achieving her world record. She called it Lexie Limitless. The latter shares her travel adventures, struggles and success as a young female traveler, and the various cultures and ways of life around the world. One of her most viewed videos is My Impossible 5 Minute Trip to North Korea, in which she recorded her 5-minute trip to North Korea.

Guinness World Records 
Alford was awarded the Guinness World Record for being the "Youngest person to travel to all sovereign countries" and "Youngest female to travel to all sovereign countries" at the age of 21 years 177 days.

Upcoming book 
As of 2022, Alford is writing a book about her being the youngest person to travel all of 196 sovereign countries of the world.

References

External links

1998 births
21st-century American photographers
21st-century American women photographers
American women travel writers
American travel writers
Guinness World Records
Living people
People from Nevada City, California
Vlogs-related YouTube channels
YouTube channels launched in 2017
YouTube travel vloggers
YouTubers from California